Country Hit Time is an album by American country singer Ernest Tubb, released in 1968 (see 1968 in music).

Track listing 
 "Dime at a Time" (Jerry Chesnut, Dottie Bruce)
 "If My Heart Had Windows" (Dallas Frazier)
 "Bottle Let Me Down" (Merle Haggard)
 "Life Turned Her That Way" (Harlan Howard)
 "Crying Time" (Buck Owens)
 "That's the Chance I'll Have to Take" (Waylon Jennings)
 "Don't Squeeze My Sharmon" (Carl Belew, Van Givens)
 "Sing Me Back Home" (Haggard)
 "Destination Atlanta GA" (Bill Hayes, Bill Howard)   
 "Image of Me" (Wayne Kemp)
 "She Went a Little Bit Farther" (Merle Travis, Mack Vickery)

Personnel 
 Ernest Tubb – vocals, guitar
 Cal Smith – guitar
 Steve Chapman – guitar
 Buddy Charleton – pedal steel guitar
 Buck Evans – bass
 Jack Drake – bass
 Billy Pfender – drums
 Bob Wilson – piano
 Jerry Smith – piano

References 

Ernest Tubb albums
1968 albums
Albums produced by Owen Bradley
Decca Records albums